Kevin Eakin (born  July 22, 1981) is a former American football quarterback. He was signed by the New York Jets of the National Football League as a street free agent in 2005. He played college football at Fordham.

Eakin was also a member of the Hamilton Tiger-Cats, Buffalo Bills, Tennessee Valley/Alabama Vipers, Georgia Force and Alabama Hammers.

Early years
Eakin attended Marjory Stoneman Douglas High School in Parkland, Florida and was a student and a letterman in football, basketball, and track. In football, he was a team captain and was named to the All-Broward County team. Kevin Eakin graduated from Marjory Stoneman Douglas High School in 2000.

College career
Eakin was a 2 year starter for the Rams at  Fordham University, starting his junior year and compiling a 19-6 record from 2002-2003, with 6,112 yards passing and 45 touchdowns for his career. In 2002, he led the Rams to their first ever Patriot League title.

Professional career

New York Jets
Eakin originally was signed by the New York Jets, who allocated him to the now-defunct Frankfurt Galaxy of NFL Europe, where he was the starting quarterback ahead of former heralded #3 overall draft pick Akili Smith. After being invited to Jets training camp in 2005, he appeared in 2 preseason games and was the last person cut before the season.

Hamilton Tiger-Cats
Eakin spent the next season in the Canadian Football League with the Hamilton Tiger-Cats, and spent most of the season as backup to controversial starter Jason Maas.

Buffalo Bills
After the 2006 CFL season, Eakin went right across the border and signed with the NFL's Buffalo Bills, who once again allocated him to Frankfurt. With the demise of NFL Europa, Eakin returned to Buffalo, but because of depth issues (he stood fourth behind J. P. Losman, Craig Nall, and draft pick Trent Edwards), he saw no playing time and was released.  However, after the release of third string QB Craig Nall, Eakin was signed onto the Buffalo Bills practice squad to serve as the team's emergency quarterback.

Team Alabama
Eakin signed with Team Alabama of the All American Football League for the 2008 season, but the league was postponed indefinitely.

Tennessee Valley / Alabama Vipers
He is now signed with the Tennessee Valley Vipers of the af2 for the 2009 season as starting quarterback. Eakin was the Vipers starter for the final 15 games of the season last year, including the four playoff wins.

References

Alabama Vipers bio
Canadian Football League bio

1981 births
Living people
Sportspeople from Saint Paul, Minnesota
Players of American football from Saint Paul, Minnesota
American football quarterbacks
American players of Canadian football
Canadian football quarterbacks
Fordham Rams football players
New York Jets players
Frankfurt Galaxy players
Hamilton Tiger-Cats players
Buffalo Bills players
Tennessee Valley Vipers players
Alabama Vipers players
Georgia Force players
Alabama Hammers players